Alemani is a surname. Notable people with the surname include:

Cecilia Alemani (born 1977), Italian curator
Gaetano Alemani (1728–1782), Italian painter